Stefan Schwab (born 27 September 1990) is an Austrian professional footballer who plays as a midfielder for Super League Greece club PAOK.

Club career

Early career
Swab was born in Saalfenten on 27 September 1990. From an early age he enjoyed sports, and, in addition to football, he was involved in biathlon, skiing, and ski jumping. His love for football prevailed, and at the age of 13 he decided to dedicate himself there entirely.

Red Bull Salzburg and Lustenau
Initially in the local team and from the age of 14 at the Salzburg Academies, where he stayed from 2004 to 2011, reaching in 2009 the Second Team with which he played in the second division of the Austrian Football Bundesliga, while he also participated in training sessions of the first team. In 2010 he was loaned to Lustenau and counted 24 appearances, six goals and seven assists. He returned but did not stay long, as he left with a new loan for Admira Wacker, with whom he celebrated his rise in the big category.

Admira Wacker
Admira Wacker activated the purchase option entered into the loan agreement and Swab moved there permanently. He stayed at the club until 2014 and took a leading role from the beginning and many responsibilities within the four lines. He played in a total of 114 games, scored 20 goals, served another 14 and naturally aroused the interest of the bigger teams.

Rapid Wien

2014–15 season

In June 2014, Rapid Wien bought him from Admira Wacker for just 400,000 euros and finally found one of its leaders in his person for the next three years.
Stefan took his place in the Starting XI from the beginning of the season alongside Thanos Petsos making a perfect match together in the midfield for the club. Schwab at age 23 made overall 36 appearances scoring five goal and serving seven.
Rapid Wien finished 2nd at the end of the league behind Red Bull Salzburg and reached the quarter-finals of the Austrian Cup.

2015–16 season
Good start at the beginning for the club in the league with six matches without losing and winning over Ajax in Champions League Qualifying rounds, everything was great for Schwab and his club. Next Qualifying round with Shakhtar Donetsk and the dream is over 1–0 lose in Ernst-Happel-Stadion with massive fan support,  was enough to break the spirit of the team. Next stop UEFA Europa League, very good come back for Stefan Schwab and the Hütteldorfer in a very strong group stage finishing first and reaching the stage of 32. Valencia was the next opponent with two matches disaster for Rapid two loses and early exclusion. 
Same season for Rapid Wien finishing second again with no trophies but better performance for Stefan, making excellent appearances in Austria and Europe. Total 50 matches nine goals and six assist.

2016–17 season
After three years Zoran Barisic was no more for The Green-Whites and Mike Büskens was hired. On 7 November 2016, after a 0–1 defeat at home against Wolfsberger AC both manager Mike Büskens and Director of Football Andreas Müller were sacked. Four days later Damir Canadi was presented as the new manager, joining Rapid from league rival SCR Altach. On 11 December, Fredy Bickel was presented as the new Director of Football. 
On 9 April 2017, after a 0–3 defeat in Ried manager Damir Canadi was sacked and replaced by his former assistant coaches Goran Djuricin and Martin Bernhard until end of season. Djuricin was later appointed as manager for the following season. It was a tough season for Rapid overall finishing 5th in the league and 3rd in the Europa League group stage. Schwab was for one more time stable and unreplaceable for his team with 39 appearances winning coaches trust and becoming captain of the club.

2017–18 season
New start new beginning for Rapid, Goran Djuricin making a good season finishing 3th in the league and Stefan winning the top goalscorer award with 12 goals and 13 overall. In November 2017 Schwab was called to represent Austria on a friendly match against Uruguay playing only for a minute entering the game as a sabtitute by German coach Franco Foda.

2018–19 season
Record season for Stefan Schwab with 50 appearances and 4291 minutes of playing time in all competisions. Great comeback in Eureapean competition entering and promoting the group stage of Europa League but losing by Inter in both Knockout games. A poor season for Goran Djuricin's club in the league, sacked after losing a game against St. Pölten by 2–0 in Allianz Stadion and replaced by Dietmar Kühbauer signing a contract for the next upcoming years.

2019–20 season
Stefan decided not to renew his contract with Rapid to search for a new challenge in his life.
For one more season Schwab was one of the main protagonists beside Taxiarchis Fountas.
Schwab in Rapid excelled in domestic and European competitions. He wore the captain's armband, played in 241 games, scored 51 goals and provided as many assists and even reached the National team of his country.

PAOK

2020–21 season
On 1 August 2020, PAOK officially announced the signing of the Austrian midfielder on two-year contract, with an option for a third year. On 5 November 2020, he scored in a 4–1 home win 2020–21 UEFA Europa League group stage game against PSV Eindhoven helping PAOK to increase the possibility of qualifying for the next phase of the UEFA Europa League.
Throughout the season he was the key player in the center of the team. He played in a total of 48 games, offering 9 goals and 9 assists. In the final of the season, he celebrated the Greek Cup. PAOK faced OSFP and prevailed with a score of 2–1. Schwap played throughout the match, while he was the one who won the penalty with which PAOK opened the score.

2021–22 season
On 12 August 2021, he scored in a crucial 2–0 home win game against Bohemian F.C., helping PAOK to qualify for the next UEFA Europa Conference League play-off round. On 9 December, he scored in a 2–0 UEFA Europa Conference League home win game against Lincoln Red Imps, sealing the qualification of the club in the phase of knockout round play-offs, for the first time in the last five years.

International career
Schwab got his first call up to the senior Austria squad for a UEFA Euro 2016 qualifier Liechtenstein in October 2015.

Career statistics

Honours
Admira Wacker
Austrian Football First League: 2010–11

PAOK 
Greek Cup: 2020–21; runner-up: 2021–22

See also 
 List of outfield association footballers who played in goal

References 

1990 births
Living people
Austrian footballers
Association football midfielders
Austria youth international footballers
Austria under-21 international footballers
Austrian Football Bundesliga players
2. Liga (Austria) players
Super League Greece players
FC Red Bull Salzburg players
FC Lustenau players
FC Admira Wacker Mödling players
SK Rapid Wien players
PAOK FC players
Austrian expatriate footballers
Austrian expatriate sportspeople in Greece
Expatriate footballers in Greece
People from Saalfelden
Footballers from Salzburg (state)